The 2016–17 Illinois State Redbirds men's basketball team represented Illinois State University during the 2016–17 NCAA Division I men's basketball season. The Redbirds, led by fifth-year head coach Dan Muller, played their home games at Redbird Arena in Normal, Illinois as a member of the Missouri Valley Conference. They finished the season 28–7, 17–1 in conference play, to finish in a tie for first place. As the number one seed in the MVC tournament, they defeated Evansville in their quarterfinal game and Southern Illinois in their semifinal game before being beaten by Wichita State in the final.

Although not winning the conference tournament, the Redbirds held the tie-breaker for the regular season title and, as a result, received an automatic bid to the National Invitation Tournament. They were awarded a number one seed where they defeated California–Irvine in their first round game before losing to Central Florida in their second round game.

Previous season 
The Redbirds finished the 2015–16 NCAA Division I men's basketball season 18–14, 12–6 in conference play, to finish in a tie for second place. They were the number three seed and were beaten by Indiana State in their quarterfinal game.

Offseason

Departures

Arrivals

Transfers

Recruiting Class

Preseason 
The Redbirds were picked to finish second in the Missouri Valley Conference preseason poll. MiKyle McIntosh and Paris Lee were selected to the All-MVC preseason team.

Roster

Schedule and results

|-
!colspan=9 style=|Exhibition Season

|-
!colspan=9 style=|Non-Conference Regular Season

|-
!colspan=9 style=|Missouri Valley Conference Regular Season

|-
!colspan=9 style=|Missouri Valley Conference Tournament
|-

|-
!colspan=9 style=|National Invitation Tournament
|-

|-

Source

References

Illinois State Redbirds men's basketball seasons
Illinois State
Illinois State Redbirds men's basketball
Illinois State Redbirds men's basketball
Illinois State Redbirds